The Sypnini are a tribe of moths in the family Erebidae.

Genera

Daddala
Hypersypnoides
Pterocyclophora
Sypna
Sypnoides

References

 
Erebinae
Moth tribes